The 2020 Massachusetts Senate election took place on November 3, 2020 to elect members of the Massachusetts Senate.

Qualifications 
The following are the qualifications to be elected to the Massachusetts Senate:

 Be eighteen years of age
 Be a registered voter in Massachusetts
 Be an inhabitant of Massachusetts for five years
 Be a resident of the district when elected
 Receive at least 300 signatures on nomination papers

Predictions

Detailed results

Closest races 
Seats where the margin of victory was under 10%:

1st Bristol and Plymouth District

Worcester and Middlesex District

Worcester, Hampden, Hampshire and Middlesex district

See also 
 2020 Massachusetts general election
2020 Massachusetts House of Representatives election
 2019–2020 Massachusetts legislature
 2021–2022 Massachusetts legislature

References

External links 
 State Legislature
 Election at Ballotpedia
 
 
  (State affiliate of the U.S. League of Women Voters)

Senate 2020
Massachusetts Senate
State Senate